Dongju: The Portrait of a Poet (Korea: 동주) is a 2016 South Korean black-and-white biographical period drama film directed by Lee Joon-ik about Yun Dong-ju. It was released in South Korea on February 17, 2016.

Plot
The story follows the life of poet Yun Dong-ju and his eventual imprisonment by the Japanese government for being involved in the Korean independence movement.

Cast
Kang Ha-neul as Yun Dong-ju
Park Jeong-min as Song Mong-gyu
 as Detective
Choi Hee-seo as Kumi
Shin Yoon-jo as Lee Yeo-jin
Min Jin-woong as Kang Cheo-Joong
 as Dong-Ju's father
Lee Bit-na as Yun Dong-Ju's younger sister
Moon Sung-keun as Jeong Ji-yong (special appearance)

Reception
The film was fifth placed on its opening weekend in South Korea, grossing .

Awards and nominations

References

Films directed by Lee Joon-ik
South Korean black-and-white films
2016 biographical drama films
South Korean biographical drama films
Biographical films about writers
Biographical films about poets
Films set in Korea under Japanese rule
2016 drama films
2010s South Korean films